"Bing Bang (Time to Dance)" is the single version of the LazyTown song "Bing Bang".

The original version is sung at the end of every episode of the Icelandic children's television series by Stephanie and is danced to by Stephanie, Sportacus and the puppets of LazyTown. In the episodes "LazyTown's Surprise Santa" , "The Holiday Spirit " , "The LazyTown Circus" and "Rockin' Robbie", a Christmas version, circus-style and rock-style of the song is performed. An extended version of the song is performed in the episodes, "Defeeted" and "LazyTown's New Superhero" .

The single was released in the United Kingdom on 27 November 2006 as a digital download, and in CD format a week later. On 10 December it reached number 4 on the UK Singles Chart. Bookmaker William Hill placed the song among five songs that were likely to become the UK Christmas number-one song in 2006. The song became a gold record after selling 100,000 copies in one week.

The song was written by Máni Svavarsson, the composer and one of the scriptwriters for LazyTown. It was originally created for Glanni Glæpur í Latabæ, a 1999–2000 theatrical production in Iceland that later evolved into the popular children's television show. According to Svavarsson, "We wanted Stephanie to sing something catchy—that kids [of] all ages could repeat after hearing it once. The conclusion was 'Bing Bang'. We also wanted the lyrics to represent her character: smiley, dancey, fun-loving."

Track listing

Maxi CD
 "Bing Bang" (Time to Dance Single Mix) – 3:16
 "Bing Bang" (Christmas version) – 2:55
 "LazyTown Megamix" – 3:43
 "I Love Christmas" – 1:38
 "Bing Bang" (Time to Dance): The Video – 3:20

"I Love Christmas" has an extended instrumental introduction on this CD.

Charts

Weekly charts

Year-end charts

References

2006 singles
LazyTown
Icelandic children's songs
2006 songs
Eurodance songs
Songs about dancing
Electropop songs
Dance-pop songs
Songs from television series

Internet memes